Gallery of the Academy may refer to:

The Galleria dell'Accademia, an art museum in Florence
The Gallerie dell'Accademia, an art museum in Venice
Sackler Gallery and other galleries of the Royal Academy